John Evans, Ieuans or Jevans (by 1525 – 1565), of Shrewsbury, Shropshire, was an English politician.

He was a Member (MP) of the Parliament of England for a now-unknown constituency in 1536, Shrewsbury in 1547, Leominster in April 1554, Much Wenlock in November 1554 and Denbigh Boroughs in 1555.

References

1565 deaths
Politicians from Shrewsbury
Members of the Parliament of England (pre-1707) for constituencies in Wales
English MPs 1536
English MPs 1547–1552
English MPs 1554–1555
English MPs 1555
Year of birth uncertain